The Americas Zone was one of the three zones of the regional Davis Cup competition in 1999.

In the Americas Zone there were four different tiers, called groups, in which teams competed against each other to advance to the upper tier. The top two teams in Group IV advanced to the Americas Zone Group III in 2000. All other teams remained in Group IV.

Participating nations

Draw
 Venue: Hasely Crawford Stadium, Port of Spain, Trinidad and Tobago
 Date: 8–14 March

  and  promoted to Group III in 2000.

Results

Trinidad and Tobago vs. Saint Lucia

Barbados vs. Bermuda

Eastern Caribbean vs. Puerto Rico

Trinidad and Tobago vs. U.S. Virgin Islands

Bermuda vs. Eastern Caribbean

Saint Lucia vs. Puerto Rico

Trinidad and Tobago vs. Puerto Rico

Barbados vs. Eastern Caribbean

U.S. Virgin Islands vs. Saint Lucia

Trinidad and Tobago vs. Bermuda

Barbados vs. Saint Lucia

U.S. Virgin Islands vs. Puerto Rico

Trinidad and Tobago vs. Barbados

Bermuda vs. Saint Lucia

Eastern Caribbean vs. U.S. Virgin Islands

Trinidad and Tobago vs. Eastern Caribbean

Barbados vs. U.S. Virgin Islands

Bermuda vs. Puerto Rico

Barbados vs. Puerto Rico

Bermuda vs. U.S. Virgin Islands

Eastern Caribbean vs. Saint Lucia

References

External links
Davis Cup official website

Davis Cup Americas Zone
Americas Zone Group IV